Sirpa-Liisa Asko-Seljavaara (born 12 October 1939 in Helsinki, Finland) is a Finnish plastic surgeon and politician. Asko-Seljavaara was National Coalition Party's Member of Finnish Parliament from 2003 to 2011.

She is the daughter of vuorineuvos Aukusti Asko-Avonius and Viola Asko-Avonius.

In 1968 she married Seppo Seljavaara. They have two children.

References 

1939 births
Living people
Politicians from Helsinki
National Coalition Party politicians
Members of the Parliament of Finland (2003–07)
Members of the Parliament of Finland (2007–11)
Women members of the Parliament of Finland
21st-century Finnish women politicians